District Commissioner is a 1963 Australian documentary about Tom Ellis, a district commissioner in Papua New Guinea.

References

External links

1963 films
1960s short documentary films
Films directed by Lee Robinson
Australian short documentary films
1960s English-language films